Newbridge railway station is a station on the Dublin to Cork railway line and Dublin Commuter Service.

History

The station opened on 4 August 1846 and was closed for goods traffic on 6 September 1976.

Bus links
South Kildare Community Transport serve the station providing a link to Milltown.

See also
 List of railway stations in Ireland

References

External links

Irish Rail Newbridge Station website

Iarnród Éireann stations in County Kildare
Railway stations opened in 1846
1846 establishments in Ireland
Railway stations in the Republic of Ireland opened in 1846